Phaeotabanus is a genus of horse flies in the family Tabanidae.

Species
Phaeotabanus aphanopterus (Wiedemann, 1828)
Phaeotabanus atopus (Fairchild, 1953)
Phaeotabanus cajennensis (Fabricius, 1787)
Phaeotabanus dissimilis Barretto, 1950)
Phaeotabanus fervens (Linnaeus, 1758)
Phaeotabanus innotescens (Walker, 1854)
Phaeotabanus insolens (Fairchild, 1958)
Phaeotabanus limpidapex (Wiedemann, 1828)
Phaeotabanus litigiosus (Walker, 1850)
Phaeotabanus longiappendiculatus (Macquart, 1855)
Phaeotabanus nigriflavus (Kröber, 1930)
Phaeotabanus obscurehirtus Kröber, 1930)
Phaeotabanus obscurepilis Kröber, 1934)
Phaeotabanus phaeopterus Fairchild, 1964)
Phaeotabanus prasiniventris (Kröber, 1929)
Philipotabanus magnificus (Kröber, 1934)

References

Tabanidae
Diptera of North America
Diptera of South America
Taxa named by Adolfo Lutz
Brachycera genera